The walpipe is a type of bagpipe found historically in Lapland.

Late 18th century researchers noted two types of bagpipes in Lapland: the säckpipa and the walpipe.

References

Bagpipes